William Earl Dutton (December 9, 1918 – August 2, 1951) was an American football halfback in the National Football League for the Pittsburgh Steelers.  He played college football at the University of Pittsburgh and was drafted in the third round of the 1943 NFL Draft by the Washington Redskins.

Bill Dutton died from injuries suffered in an automobile accident.  He died about ten
hours after his convertible upset and sheared a utility pole in suburban Pittsburgh.

"Wild Bill" Dutton was drafted by the Washington Redskins in 1943 but went into the
service before he was able to play a down with them.  After the War, he was sold
to the Pittsburgh Steelers and played for them in 1946.  He was released by the
Steelers on September 22, 1947 and was signed by the NFL's New York Yankees
a month later.  He was released by the Yankees on November 8, 1947.

1918 births
1951 deaths
American football halfbacks
Sportspeople from Morgantown, West Virginia
Pittsburgh Panthers football players
Pittsburgh Steelers players
Players of American football from West Virginia
Road incident deaths in Pennsylvania
United States Army personnel of World War II